Luis Orlando Rodríguez (born June 27, 1980), is a Venezuelan former professional baseball shortstop. He played in Major League Baseball (MLB) for the Minnesota Twins, San Diego Padres and Seattle Mariners. He is a switch hitter and throws right-handed.

Career

Minnesota Twins
Rodríguez made his major league debut with the Minnesota Twins on May 21, . He was recalled from Triple-A Rochester to replace rookie Jason Bartlett, who won the starting job out of spring training, but began to have trouble at the plate. From -, Rodríguez was the primary second baseman at Rochester, although he played a handful of games at third base and shortstop in 2004. With excellent plate discipline, he hit .295 and .286 respectively, with a combined .354 on-base percentage. When Rodríguez got the call, he was hitting .278 with a .339 OBP in 33 games. In 79 games for the Twins, he hit .269 with 2 home runs and 20 runs batted in. In 2006, Rodríguez split time between Rochester and Minnesota, with the Twins, and he was .235 in 59 games. Inspired by the "Rory Fitzpatrick for NHL All-Star" Campaign, Rodriguez was the subject of a similar campaign known as "Vote for L-Rod" which aimed to elect him to the 2007 MLB All-Star game as the American League's starting 3rd baseman. For the 2007 season, Rodríguez hit .219 in 68 games.

San Diego Padres
Rodriguez was claimed off waivers by the San Diego Padres on October 4, . He made his Padres debut on July 5,  after spending the first three months of 2008 with the PCL's Portland Beavers. In his first season with the Padres, Rodríguez hit a career high .287 in 64 games. The following season, Rodríguez set a career high in walks with 37 despite hitting a career low .202 for the Padres.

Cleveland Indians
On December 2, 2009, Rodriguez, signed a minor league contract with the Cleveland Indians with an invite to Spring Training.

Chicago White Sox
On April 29, 2010, Rodriguez signed with the Chicago White Sox and was assigned to the Triple-A Charlotte Knights. Rodríguez spent the entire season in AAA.

Seattle Mariners
He became a free agent on November 2, 2011, after declaring free agency. On November 23, he re-signed a minor league contract with Seattle. He was also given an invitation to spring training.

Los Angeles Angels of Anaheim
Rodríguez spent the 2013 season in the Salt Lake Bees organization, the Angels AAA minor league affiliate.

Bridgeport Bluefish
Rodriguez signed with the Bridgeport Bluefish of the Atlantic League of Professional Baseball for the 2015 season.

See also
 List of Major League Baseball players from Venezuela

External links

Retrosheet

1980 births
Living people
Bridgeport Bluefish players
Caribes de Anzoátegui players
Caribes de Oriente players
Charlotte Knights players
Everett AquaSox players
Fort Myers Miracle players
Gulf Coast Twins players
Lake Elsinore Storm players
Leones del Caracas players
Major League Baseball players from Venezuela
Major League Baseball shortstops
Minnesota Twins players
Minor league baseball coaches
Navegantes del Magallanes players
New Britain Rock Cats players
People from Cojedes (state)
Portland Beavers players
Quad Cities River Bandits players
Rochester Red Wings players
Salt Lake Bees players
San Diego Padres players
Seattle Mariners players
Tacoma Rainiers players
Tiburones de La Guaira players
Tigres de Aragua players
Venezuelan baseball coaches
Venezuelan expatriate baseball players in the United States